The 2018 Tim Hortons Brier, Canada's national men's curling championship, was held from March 3 to 11, 2018 at the Brandt Centre in Regina, Saskatchewan. The winning team represented Canada at the 2018 World Men's Curling Championship from March 31 to April 8 at the Orleans Arena in Las Vegas, United States.

This marked the fifth time the Brier was held in Regina, the first time since 2006.

The 2018 tournament was the first to use a new 16-team format, featuring representation by all fourteen member associations of Curling Canada, alongside the defending champions (as Team Canada), and a new wildcard team. As part of this new format, the Bronze medal game was removed from the schedule.

Teams
Curling Canada introduced a new 16-team format for both the Brier and Tournament of Hearts for 2018, under which all 14 member associations of Curling Canada are now represented in the main field, rather than being limited by a pre-qualifying tournament. The teams were divided into two pools for round robin play, after which the top four teams from each advanced to a Championship Pool. Alongside the inclusion of the previous year's champions as Team Canada, the final spot in the tournament was filled by a wildcard play-in game held on the Friday before the tournament.

The rinks of John Epping (Ontario), Mike Fournier (Quebec), and Greg Smith (Newfoundland and Labrador) made their Brier debuts.

Team Canada's Brad Gushue set a new record for the most Canadian national men's championship game wins as a skip when he skipped the 114th victory of his Brier career over the Northwest Territories on March 5.

CTRS ranking

Wildcard game
A play-in game was held on March 2, 2018 that determined the wildcard team that rounded out the tournament field. It was played between the top two teams on the Canadian Team Ranking System standings who lost in their provincial championship: the Fort Rouge Curling Club's Mike McEwen rink and the Granite Curling Club's Jason Gunnlaugson rink, both from Winnipeg.

CTRS standings as of February 12

Wildcard Game
Friday, March 2, 19:00

Round-robin standings

Round-robin results
All draw times are listed in Central Standard Time (UTC−06:00).

Draw 1

Saturday, March 3, 14:00

Draw 2

Saturday, March 3, 19:00

Draw 3

Sunday, March 4, 09:00

Draw 4
Sunday, March 4, 14:00

Draw 5

Sunday, March 4, 19:00

Draw 6

Monday, March 5, 09:00

Draw 7

Monday, March 5, 14:00

Draw 8
Monday, March 5, 19:00

Draw 9
Tuesday, March 6, 09:00

Draw 10
Tuesday, March 6, 14:00

Draw 11
Tuesday, March 6, 19:00

Draw 12
Wednesday, March 7, 09:00

Draw 13

Wednesday, March 7, 14:00

Draw 14
Wednesday, March 7, 19:00

Placement round
Each team that finished fifth through eight in their pool played the team that finished in the same position in the opposite pool for the purpose of determining final tournament ranking. For example, the winner of the game between fifth place teams was ranked ninth place overall, the loser of that game was ranked tenth place, and so on.

Seeding games
All game times are listed in Central Standard Time (UTC−06:00).

A5 vs. B5
Friday, March 9, 09:00

A6 vs. B6
Friday, March 9, 09:00

A7 vs. B7
Friday, March 9, 09:00

A8 vs. B8
Friday, March 9, 09:00

Championship pool standings
All wins and losses earned in the round robin (including results against teams that failed to advance) were carried forward into the Championship Pool.

Championship pool results
All draw times are listed in Central Standard Time (UTC−06:00).

Draw 15
Thursday, March 8, 14:00

Draw 16
Thursday, March 8, 19:00

Draw 17
Friday, March 9, 14:00

Draw 18
Friday, March 9, 19:00

Playoffs

1 vs. 2
Saturday, March 10, 19:00

3 vs. 4
Saturday, March 10, 14:00

Semifinal
Sunday, March 11, 09:00

Final
Sunday, March 11, 16:00

Statistics

Top 5 player percentages
Final Round Robin Percentages; minimum 6 games

Perfect games
Round Robin and Championship Pool only

Awards
The awards and all-star teams are listed as follows:

All-Star Teams
First Team
Skip:  Brad Gushue, Team Canada
Third:  Mark Nichols, Team Canada
Second:  Brett Gallant, Team Canada
Lead:  Denni Neufeld, Team Wildcard

Second Team
Skip:  John Epping, Ontario
Third:  Steve Laycock, Saskatchewan 
Second:  E.J. Harnden, Northern Ontario
Lead:  Geoff Walker, Team Canada

Ross Harstone Sportsmanship Award
 Greg Smith, Newfoundland and Labrador Skip

Paul McLean Award
Murray McCormick, Regina Leader-Post

Hec Gervais Most Valuable Player Award
 Brad Gushue, Team Canada Skip

Notes

References

External links
Official website

 
2018 in Canadian curling
The Brier
Sports competitions in Regina, Saskatchewan
2018 in Saskatchewan
Curling in Saskatchewan
Tim Hortons Brier